Graf Orlock is an American hardcore punk band formed in 2003 in Los Angeles, California, United States. They are named after Count Orlok from the 1922 film Nosferatu. The band consists of members of the hardcore punk bands Greyskull, Arctic Choke, Dangers and Ghostlimb, and employs audio snippets and script dialogue from action films such as The Terminator, Aliens and RoboCop in all their songs, which has led to the band being jokingly described as "cinema-grind". The band formed after guitarist Jason Schmidt and drummer Alan Hunter along with bassist Sven Calhoun and vocalist Kalvin Kristoff begun releasing EPs and split albums. In 2006, they started the Destination Time trilogy based on a screenplay that Schmidt and Hunter had been working on in university; the second instalment was the 2007 EP Destination Time Tomorrow which was listed at number 16 in Decibel Magazine's top 40 releases of 2007. Their latest album Crimetraveler was released in 2016 through Vitriol Records, a label run by members of the band and also featuring Ghostlimb, Robotosaurus, Owen Hart, Teeth, Dangers, Birds in Row and Totalt Jävla Mörker.

In October 2018, the band's label, Vitriol Records, announced a forthcoming album, Examination of Violent Cinema Vol. 1, which was released in December of that year. The album contains 12 songs based on the theme of criticism of recent motion picture releases.

Members
All members use multiple pseudonyms, but these names are most commonly used:

Current
"Bruce Da Deuce" – Bass (2011–present)
"Alan Hunter" – Drums (2003–present)
"Jason Schmidt" – Guitar, vocals, (2003–present)
"Karl Bournze" – Vocals (2008–present)

Former
"Sven Calhoun" – bass (2003–2011)
"Kalvin Kristoff" – vocals (2003–2008)
"Jeff Hermann"
"Ivan Somple"
”Michael Morningstar”

Discography
Studio albums
Destination Time Yesterday (2006)
Destination Time Today (2009)
Crimetraveler (2016)
Examination Of Violent Cinema, Volume 1 (December 2018)

EPs
Graf Orlock (2004)
Corpserate Greed (2004)
Destination Time Tomorrow (2007)
Doombox (2011)
Los Angeles (2012)

Splits
With Hurry Up and Kill Yourself (2004)
With Greyskull (2005)

See also
ArnoCorps
Austrian Death Machine

References

External links
Official website

American grindcore musical groups
Metalcore musical groups from California
Hardcore punk groups from California
Heavy metal musical groups from California
Musical groups from Los Angeles
2003 establishments in California
Musical groups established in 2003
Musical quartets
Level Plane Records artists